Caitlin Yeo is an Australian musician and film composer, whose credits include the feature film Jucy, All My Friends Are Leaving Brisbane, and The Rocket. Yeo is a graduate of the Australian Film Television and Radio School and Sydney University. Her work has won a number of awards including 2007 APRA AGSC Screen Music Award for Best Music for a Documentary and 2011 APRA Professional Development Award and received nominations in 2008, 2010 and 2012. She also teaches composition and film music theory at The Australian Institute of Music.

Yeo was nominated for an AACTA Award for Best Original Music Score for her work on The Rocket, but lost against Craig Armstrong of The Great Gatsby. At the APRA Music Awards of 2013 Yeo won Feature Film Score of the Year for The Rocket.

Select credits
Footy Chicks (2006)
All My Friends Are Leaving Brisbane (2007)
Bomb Harvest (2007)
 "The Long Goodbye" (2009)
 "The Matilda Candidate" (2009)
 "Feral Peril" (2009)
Jucy (2010)
 "Black and White and Sex" (2011)
 "My America" (2011)
 "Ochre and Ink" (2012)
 The Rocket (2013)

Awards and nominations

APRA Music Awards

The APRA Music Awards are presented annually from 1982 by the Australasian Performing Right Association (APRA), "honouring composers and songwriters". They include the associated Screen Music Awards handed out by APRA, Australasian Mechanical Copyright Owners Society (AMCOS) and Australian Guild of Screen Composers (AGSC), which "acknowledges excellence and innovation in the field of screen composition." In 2018 Yeo was appointed the president of AGSC.

|-
| 2007 || Bomb Harvest (Caitlin Yeo) || Best Music for a Documentary || 
|-
| 2012 || Seduction in the City: The Birth of Shopping (Yeo) || Best Music for a Documentary || 
|-
| 2013 || The Rocket (Yeo) || Feature Film Score of the Year || 
|-
| 2015 || The Great Australian Race Riot (Yeo) || Best Music for a Documentary || 
|-
| rowspan="2"| 2016 || Getting Frank Gehry (Yeo) || Best Music for a Documentary || 
|-
| Compass (Yeo) || Best Television Theme || 
|-
| rowspan="4"| 2018 || rowspan="2"| The Butterfly Tree (Yeo) || Feature Film Score of the Year || 
|-
| Best Soundtrack Album || 
|-
| The House with Annabel Crabb (Yeo) || Best Music for a Mini-Series or Telemovie || 
|-
| Barbara (Yeo) || Best Music for a Short Film || 
|-
| rowspan="3"| 2019 || Danger Close: The Battle of Long Tan (Yeo) || Feature Film Score of the Year || 
|-
| "Where Inspiration Lives: Sydney Opera House" (Yeo) || Best Music for an Advertisement || 
|-
| The Pacific: In the Wake of Captain Cook with Sam Neill (Yeo) || Best Television Theme || 
|-
| 2020 || I Want to Make a Film About Women (Yeo) || Best Music for a Short Film || 
|-
| rowspan="2"| 2021 || Playing with Sharks: The Valerie Taylor Story (Yeo) || Best Music for a Documentary || 
|-
| Wakefield (Maria Alfonsine, Yeo) || Best Music for a Television Series or Serial || 
|-
| rowspan="5"| 2022
| "Ms Represented with Annabel Crabb" (Andrew Scott & Yeo)
| Best Music for a Documentary
| 
|-
| New Gold Mountain (Yeo)
| Best Soundtrack Album
| 
|-
| New Gold Mountain (Yeo)
| rowspan="2"| Best Television Theme
| 
|-
| The PM's Daughter (Basil Hogios & Yeo)
| 
|-
| New Gold Mountain (Yeo)
| New Gold Mountain
| 
|-

ARIA Music Awards

The ARIA Music Awards is an annual awards ceremony that recognises excellence, innovation, and achievement across all genres of the music of Australia.

! Reference
|-
|2021 || Wakefield (Season One Official Soundtrack) || Best Original Soundtrack, Cast or Show Album ||  || 
|-

References

External links
Personal website

APRA Award winners
Australian film score composers
Academic staff of the Australian Institute of Music
Living people
Macquarie University alumni
Year of birth missing (living people)
Australian women film score composers
Australian women composers
21st-century composers
21st-century women composers